Louis-Adrien Lusson (1788–1864) was a French architect. His projects in Paris include the churches of Saint-Eugène at 6 rue Sainte-Cécile, 9th arrondissement (1855), and Saint-François Xavier des Missions étrangères (1861–63). He was born in La Flèche and died in Rome.

External links

http://fr.structurae.de/persons/data/index.cfm?id=d004447

1788 births
1864 deaths
19th-century French architects
French ecclesiastical architects